The 2016 season is Manchester City Women's Football Club's 28th season of competitive football and its third season in the FA Women's Super League and at the top level of English women's football, having been promoted from the FA Women's Premier League before the 2014 season. This season will also be the first occasion on which City Women contest a European competition, having qualified through their runners-up finish in the 2015 Women's Super League.

Non-competitive

Pre-season

Friendly

Fatima Bint Mubarak Ladies Sports Academy Challenge

Friendly

Competitions

Women's Super League

League table

Results summary

Results by matchday

Matches

FA Cup

WSL Cup

Champions League

Round of 32

Round of 16

Campaign continued in the following season

Squad information

Playing statistics

Appearances (Apps.) numbers are for appearances in competitive games only including sub appearances
Red card numbers denote:   Numbers in parentheses represent red cards overturned for wrongful dismissal.

Goalscorers
Includes all competitive matches. The list is sorted alphabetically by surname when total goals are equal.

Correct as of 17 October 2016

Transfers and loans

Transfers in

Transfers out

Loans out

References

16